is a Japanese garden located in Mito, Ibaraki Prefecture, Japan. Along with Kenroku-en and Koraku-en, it is considered one of the Three Great Gardens of Japan.

Overview
Kairaku-en was built in the year 1842 by Tokugawa Nariaki, daimyō of Mito Domain. Unlike Japan's other two great gardens, Kairaku-en was originally intended to serve for the enjoyment of the public, by which Tokugawa Nariaki meant the samurai class. Ordinary commoners were admitted only on certain dates each year. The gardens are especially noted for the plum blossom season, which usually takes place in late February and March.  Besides the plum tree grove, where one hundred different plum tree varieties with white, pink and red blossoms are planted, Kairaku-en also features a bamboo grove, cedar grove, and the Kobuntei, a three-story pavilion for use in poetry contests and for the Japanese tea ceremony. 

Following the Meiji restoration, the park became property of the Japanese government, and the Tokiwa Jinja, a Shinto shrine was built within its grounds. The garden was officially renamed Tokiwa Park in 1873. In 1922 it was designated a National Historic Site and also a National Place of Scenic Beauty. The Kobuntei pavilion burned down in 1945 during the bombing of Mito in World War II,  but was restored in 1958. The name of the park was also officially changed to "Kairaku-en" in 1948. The total area of the park is 300 hectares. It is served by  Kairaku-en Station on the JR East  Jōban Line, but the station is only open during the plum blossom season. Sakurayama, noted for its cherry blossoms in April, is part of the park area, but is located on the opposite side of the train tracks.

Four seasons
Kairaku-en is famous for its plum tree blossoms, which can be enjoyed year-round. In spring, the park also has a great deal of sakura, or cherry blossoms. The park is also famous for its koyo, or autumn leaves. The full area of the park is 58 hectares, and features a variety of different flora and fauna.

Gallery

See also

 Kōdōkan
List of Historic Sites of Japan (Ibaraki)
List of Places of Scenic Beauty of Japan (Ibaraki)

References

External links

Kairaku-en official website 
Mito City official home page 
Japan-guide: Mito travel
Real Japanese Garden

Gardens in Japan
Mito, Ibaraki
Gardens in Ibaraki Prefecture
Historic Sites of Japan
Places of Scenic Beauty
1842 establishments in Japan